This is a list of artists who were born in the Nigeria or whose artworks are closely associated with that country. Artists are listed by field of study and then by last name in alphabetical order, and they may be listed more than once, if they work in many fields of study.

Architects

Painters and drawers 
 Ade Adekola (born 1966), conceptual artist, and painter
 Tayo Adenaike (born 1954), painter
 Alimi Adewale (born 1974), painter
 Ayo Akínwándé, drawings and works on paper, printmaker
 Olu Ajayi (born 1963), painter, cartoonist, and art critic.
 Samson Akinnire (born 1986), painter, and sculptor
 Kelechi Amadi-Obi (born 1969), photographer, painter, and magazine publisher
 Chike Aniakor (born 1939), painter
 Kingsley Ayogu (born 1994), painter of hyperrealistic works
 Jimoh Buraimoh (born 1943), painter
 Chinwe Chukwuogo-Roy (1952–2012), Nigerian-born English figurative painter
 Fola David (born 1993), scientific illustrator, medical doctor, painter
 Daddy K (born 1989), Nigerian-born painter, living in Dubai
 Dipo Doherty (born 1991), hyperrealistic painter
 George Edozie (born 1972), painter
 Emmanuel Eni (born 1967), Nigerian-born German painter, sculptor, multimedia artist, and performance artist
 Ben Enwonwu (1917–1994), painter, and sculptor
 Stella Fakiyesi (born c. 1971), painter, photographer, and cinematographer
 Lemi Ghariokwu (born 1955), painter, illustrator, graphic designer
 Dele Jegede (born 1945), painter, art historian, cartoonist, curator, art critic, art administrator, and teacher
 Emmanuel Taiwo Jegede (born 1943), painter, poet, storyteller, printmaker, and a sculptor
 Tony Nsofor (born 1973), painter
 Nkiru Nzegwu (born 1954), painter, philosopher, author, curator, and art historian
 Gani Odutokun (1946–1995), painter and illustrator
 Chris Ofili (born 1968), British painter of Nigerian descent
 Uche Okeke (1933–2016), Modernist painter, sculptor, illustrator, and teacher
 Ikechukwu Francis Okoronkwo (born 1970), painter, sculptor, and author
 Ebele Okoye (born 1969), Nigerian-born German painter and animator
 Asiru Olatunde (1918–1993), blacksmith and painter
 Mike Omoighe (1958–2021), painter, curator, art critic, and teacher
 Nengi Omuku (born 1987), sculptor and painter
 Aina Onabolu (1882–1963), Modernist painter and teacher, he introduced art curriculum to high schools in Nigeria
 Bruce Onobrakpeya (born 1932), painter, printmaker, and sculptor
 Ufuoma Onobrakpeya (born 1971), painter, printmaker, teacher
 Folakunle Oshun (born 1984), painter, sculptor, and curator
 Muraina Oyelami (born 1940), painter and drummer of Yoruba descent
 Laolu Senbanjo (born 1982), American visual artist, musician, singer, songwriter, and attorney; of Yorba Nigerian descent
 Twins Seven Seven (1944–2011), painter, sculptor and musician
 Ada Udechukwu (born 1960), painter and poet
 Obiora Udechukwu (born 1946), painter and poet
 Oscar Ukonu (born 1993), ballpoint pen draftsman

Photographers 
 Adetona Omokanye (born 1990), photographer and photojournalist
 Jenevieve Aken (born 1989), photographer known for documentary photos, self-portraits and urban photos
 Lola Akinmade Åkerström, Nigerian-born Swedish photographer and travel writer
 Solomon Osagie Alonge (1911–1994), was a self-taught photographer and pioneer of Nigerian photography
 Kelechi Amadi-Obi (born 1969), photographer, painter, and magazine publisher
 Aisha Augie-Kuta (born 1980), photographer and filmmaker
 Nora Awolowo (born 1999), documentary photographer, film director, cinematographer, producer, and creative director
 Yetunde Ayeni-Babaeko (born 1978), photographer
 Anny Robert (born 1990), celebrity photographer

Printmakers 
 Ayo Akínwándé, printmaker, drawings and works on paper
 Toyin Ojih Odutola (born 1985), Nigerian-born American printmaker, also known for her multimedia drawings and works on paper
 Bruce Onobrakpeya (born 1932), painter, printmaker, and sculptor
 Ufuoma Onobrakpeya (born 1971), painter, printmaker, teacher

Sculptors 
 Jimoh Aliu (1939–2020), sculptor, screenplay writer, playwright and director
 Olu Amoda (born 1959), sculptor, muralist, furniture designer, and multimedia artist
 Sokari Douglas Camp (born 1958), Nigerian-born English sculptor
 Dilomprizulike (born 1960), Nigerian-born German sculptor
 Erhabor Emokpae (1934–1984), sculptor, muralist, graphic artist, and painter
 Emmanuel Eni (born 1967), Nigerian-born German sculptor, painter, multimedia artist, and performance artist
 Akin Fakeye (born 1936), wood carver
 Azeez Kayode Fakeye (born 1965), sculptor
 Lukman Alade Fakeye (born 1983), Yoruba Nigerian sculptor and woodcarver
 Ovia Idah (1903–1968), sculptor 
 Emmanuel Taiwo Jegede (born 1943), painter, poet, storyteller, printmaker, and a sculptor
 Folakunle Oshun (born 1984), painter, sculptor, and curator
 Dotun Popoola (born 1981), metal sculptor
 Twins Seven Seven (1944–2011), painter, sculptor and musician
 Yinka Shonibare (born 1962), British sculptor and installation artist, of Nigerian descent

See also 
 List of Nigerians
 List of Nigerian women artists

Artists 
Artists
Nigerian